Nizmanakuchi is a village in Kamrup, situated in north bank of river Brahmaputra .

Transport
Nizmanakuchi is accessible through National Highway 31. All major private commercial vehicles ply between Nizmanakuchi and nearby towns.

See also
 Natun Jharobari
 Nartap

References

Villages in Kamrup district